Bedrakeri is a sub village of Belke which in Bhatkal, Uttara Kannada district, Karnataka, India. It is a small village of approximately 150 people near the Arabian Sea.  The NH-66 Mangalore to Karwar national highway and Konkan railway crosses the village.

Villages in Uttara Kannada district